The International Quran Recital Competition, Malaysia is the international Islamic Quran recital event that is held annually since 1961 in Malaysia. It is most populated international Quran competition all over the muslim world. Sometimes it called internationally as Malaysia International Al-Quran Recitation and Memorisation Competition.

History
Tunku Abdul Rahman (first Malaysian prime minister) was a founder of the International Quran Recital Competition. The program was started on 9 March 1961 at Stadium Merdeka, Kuala Lumpur and 7 countries took part in this competition including Singapore, Brunei, Thailand, Philippines, Indonesia, Sarawak and Malaya. In 1985, the competition was moved to the Putra World Trade Centre (PWTC).

Winners

Notes

 Held on 1386 Hijri.
 Held on 1416 Hijri.

See also 
 Dubai International Holy Quran Award
 Islamic Republic of Iran's International Holy Quran Competition
 Muhammad VI Awards for the Holy Quran
 Tijan an Nur International Quran Competition

References

Islam in Malaysia
Quran reciting
Recurring events established in 1961
1961 establishments in Malaya
Television in Malaysia
Quranic studies
Islamic awards